KBHT (104.9 FM) is a radio station broadcasting an adult contemporary format. Licensed to Bellmead, Texas, United States, the station serves the Waco area. The station is currently owned by M&M Broadcasters.    Its studios are in Waco, and its transmitter is located west of Mexia, Texas.

Translators

History
The station was assigned the call letters KYCX on February 28, 1983, and was originally licensed to serve Mexia, Texas.  Branded as "Kicks 105", it programmed country music for much of its existence. 104.9 was the original FM sister to 1590 KEKR, which signed on as KBUS in 1956. 104.9 signed on in 1984, with the AM & FM simulcasted. Matthew & Lisa Groveton were the original owners. On April 4, 1984, the station changed its call sign to KYCX-FM as 1590 KBUS dropped its longtime call set to become KYCX. On September 16, 2005, 104.9 became KWGW as Jack FM style country format, playing a span of several decades, as George FM. At this point, 104.9 disassociated itself with its City of License in Mexia and began targeting Waco. On August 23, 2007, 104.9 returned to KRQX-FM, as Q 104.9, and returning to a more traditional country format. . In 2010, "104.9 The Beat" debuted with a Hip Hop format, giving Waco its first ever urban formatted station. The station changed its city of license to Bellmead, when the tower was moved into Waco, effective August 27, 2013. The call letters were soon changed to KWBT, to match the new moniker. The calls stood for Waco's Beat.

On January 1, 2014, KWBT and 94.5 KBCT swapped signals, with KWBT moving to 94.5 while KBCT took over the 104.9 signal. It then relaunched as Rhythmic Top 40 "Hot 104.9" again changing the call letters to KBHT.

Sometime in August 2015, KBHT let go the entire air staff and flipped from Rhythmic CHR to Urban AC utilizing Westwood One's "The Touch" satellite feed, and entirely adopted it as "Magic 104.9" on October 2.

On August 20, 2016, KBHT changed their format from urban contemporary (which moved to Its HD3 subchannel and the 104.5 translator) to adult contemporary, branded as "Mix 104.9".

On August 29, 2017, KBHT changed their format from adult contemporary to adult hits (format moving from KBHT-HD2), branded as "104.9 Bob FM".

On August 30, 2017 KBHT-HD2 and associated 101.3 translator dropped "Bob FM" and relaunched as a country station named "The Highway" in order to flank sister stations KRMX & KOOV "92.9 & 106.9 Shooter FM", in an attempt to be more competitive against iHeart Media's WACO-FM.

On February 15, 2021, KBHT-HD2 and its 101.3 translator changed their format from country to oldies, branded as "Cool 101.3".

On June 29, 2021, an announcement came that "104.9 Bob FM" will rebrand as "Star 104.9".

References

External links

BHT
Mainstream adult contemporary radio stations in the United States